SV Juventus is a football team from Antriòl, Kralendijk on Bonaire in the Caribbean Netherlands, playing at the top level.

The club was founded in 1973 as a split-off from SV Vitesse.

Squad

Achievements
Bonaire League: 14
Winner: 1976, 1977, 1984, 1984–85, 1987, 1989, 1992, 1994, 2004–05, 2007–08, 2009, 2010, 2012, 2013
Winner (transitional championship): 
Runner-up: 1979, 1988, 1995, 2016–17, 2017–18
Runner-up (transitional championship): 2002–03, 2005–06
Netherlands Antilles Championship:
 Runner-up: 1977, 1985, 1988, 1992, 2001, 2008

Performance in CONCACAF competitions
CFU Club Championship: 1 appearance
2001 – First Round – Lost to SNL 10 – 2 on aggregate (stage 1 of 2)

CONCACAF Champions' Cup: 3 appearances
1986 – First Round (Caribbean South) – Lost to SV Robinhood 9 – 0 on aggregate (stage 1 of 5)
1989 – First Round – Group D – 4th placed – 3 pts  (stage 1 of 3)
1993 – First Round (Caribbean) – Lost to Trintoc FC 4 – 0 on aggregate (stage 1 of 5)

References

Football clubs in Bonaire
Football clubs in the Netherlands Antilles
Association football clubs established in 1973
1973 establishments in Bonaire
Kralendijk